Gary du Plessis (19 August 1974 – 25 March 2006) was a Zimbabwean cricketer. A right-handed batsman and right-arm medium-pace bowler, he played one first-class match for Mashonaland A in 1997 and three first-class matches for Mashonaland in 2000.

Born in Salisbury (now Harare), he was the brother of Dean du Plessis, a blind cricket commentator.

References

External links
 
 

1974 births
2006 deaths
Cricketers from Harare
Mashonaland A cricketers
Mashonaland cricketers
Zimbabwean cricketers